Torque was an American thrash metal band from the San Francisco Bay Area, that was formed in 1994. The band consisted of Phil Demmel (Machine Head, Vio-lence) on lead guitar and lead vocals, Ray Vegas on rhythm guitar, bassist Deen Dell and drummer Mark Hernandez.

Torque released three demos between 1994 and 1997; the self-titled debut album, released on Mascot Records in 1996, stands as their sole studio release.

Three songs from the original release were written whilst the band was still recording as Vio-lence, which means that three of the songs have lyrics written by Sean Killian before he left the band in 1993: "Breed", "Again", and "Shooter". Upon making the decision to form Torque, Demmel entered the studio to re-record the vocals and on the strength of those demos, Mascot signed the band, who then went to 'O' Street Studios in Antioch, California to record the full album with Rob Beaton.

References

Musical groups established in 1994
Musical groups from San Francisco
American thrash metal musical groups